This Road Goes Everywhere is the debut studio album recorded by Canadian country signer Alee, released independently under the imprint Gotta Be Alee on July 18, 2013. The record produced four singles, two of which charted at Canadian country radio. "Don't Say You Love Me" peaked at number 25 on the Canada Country chart, a rare accomplishment for an independent artist. The album was nominated for Album of the Year at the 2013 Alberta Country Music Association (ACMA) awards.

Background
Alee met Dave Temple and Johnny "Six Pack" Gasparic "a few years" before the album was released and began recording music. Gasparic was later brought on as the record's producer. All of the songs were written solely by Alee, except for one track co-written by Emma-Lee and Karen Kosowski. The album's title and pending release was announced in May 2013.

Singles
Alee's debut single, "Real", was released February 1, 2012. "What're We Waitin' For?" was released as the follow-up on August 27, 2012. A third single, "Don't Say You Love Me" was released January 8, 2013. This was her first single to impact the Canada Country chart and her first to hit the top 25. It was also named the "fastest moving indie country single" of 2013. "Crazy" was released July 1, 2013 as the album's fourth and final single. It reached 32 on the Canada Country chart.

Track listing

Chart performance

Singles

References

2013 debut albums